is a Japanese former professional baseball player and manager who spent his entire career with the Hanshin Tigers of Japan's Nippon Professional Baseball (NPB). His number 23, was retired by the Tigers.  He works for the Asahi Broadcasting Corporation as a live radio and TV baseball commentator.

Career
He was famous for his steady batting and his defence at shortstop, and received the NPB Best Nine Award nine times, in 1955-60, 1962, 1964-65. This is the best record until now. He was often compared with the famous 12th century general, Minamoto no Yoshitsune, and they called Yoshida "Ushiwakamaru", Yoshitune's name as a child.

After retirement, he became the manager of the Hanshin Tigers three times, in 1975-77, 1985–87, 1997-98. The 1985 season was his best. His Hanshin Tigers won the Central League's championship for the first time since 1964, and defeated the Seibu Lions in the Japan Series for their only championship. That year Yoshida was also named the winner of the Matsutaro Shoriki Award.

From 1989-95, Yoshida lived in Paris, and managed the French national baseball team, but his team failed to qualify for the Olympic Games twice; first for the 1992 Summer Olympics at Barcelona and again for the 1996 Summer Olympics at Atlanta. Since then, Yoshida has had a new nickname, "Monsieur". He was selected as a member of the Japanese Baseball Hall of Fame in 1992.

External links
Career stats at Japan Baseball Daily

1933 births
Living people
Baseball people from Kyoto
Japanese Baseball Hall of Fame inductees
Japanese baseball players
Nippon Professional Baseball shortstops
Osaka Tigers players
Hanshin Tigers players
Managers of baseball teams in Japan
Hanshin Tigers managers